The Mulan River or Creek is a river in Fujian, China, which drains into Xinghua Bay on the Taiwan Strait between the East and South China Seas. It is the largest river in Central Fujian.

References

Rivers of Fujian